Rajas (Sanskrit: रजस्) is one of the three Guṇas (tendencies, qualities, attributes), a philosophical and psychological concept developed by the Samkhya school of Hindu philosophy. The other two qualities are Sattva (goodness, balance) and Tamas (lethargy, violence, disorder). Rajas is innate tendency or quality that drives motion, energy and activity.

Rajas is sometimes translated as passion, where it is used in the sense of activity, without any particular value and it can contextually be either good or bad. Rajas helps actualize the other two gunas.

Description
This category of qualities have been widely adopted by various schools of Hinduism for categorizing behavior and natural phenomena. The three qualities are:

 Sattva is the quality of balance, harmony, goodness, purity, universalizing, holistic, constructive, creative, building, positive attitude, luminous, serenity, being-ness, peaceful, virtuous.
 Rajas is the quality of passion, activity, neither good nor bad and sometimes either, self-centeredness, egoistic, individualizing, driven, moving, dynamic.
 Tamas is the quality of imbalance, disorder, chaos, anxiety, impure, destructive, delusion, negative, dull or inactive, apathy, inertia or lethargy, violent, vicious, ignorant.

In Indian philosophy, these qualities are not considered as present in either-or fashion. Rather, everyone and everything has all three, only in different proportions and in different contexts. The living being or substance is viewed as the net result of the joint effect of these three qualities.

According to Samkya school, no one and nothing is either purely Sattvic or purely Rajasic or purely Tamasic. One's nature and behavior is a complex interplay of all of these, with each guna in varying degrees. In some, the conduct is Rajasic with significant influence of Sattvic guna, in some it is Rajasic with significant influence of Tamasic guna, and so on.

Discussion
Rajas is that quality or attribute in a substance (Prakriti) or individual which promotes or upholds the activity of the other aspects of nature (prakriti) such as one or more of the following:
 action,
 change, mutation;
 passion, excitement;
 birth, creation, generation.
If a person or thing tends to be extremely active, excitable, or passionate, that person or thing could be said to have a preponderance of rajas. It is contrasted with the quality of tamas, which is the quality of inactivity, darkness, and laziness, and with sattva, which is the quality of purity, clarity, calmness and creativity. Rajas is viewed as being more positive than tamas, and less positive than sattva, except, perhaps, for one who has "transcended the gunas" and achieved equanimity in all fields of relative life.

See also
Samkhyakarika (verses 12 to 14 discuss Sattva, Rajas and Tamas)

References

Guna